Lifegate Christian School may refer to:

Lifegate Christian School (Eugene, Oregon)
Lifegate Christian School (Seguin, Texas)
Lifegate Christian School (Omaha, Nebraska)